Josef Brabenec Jr. (born 24 April 1957) is a Canadian former professional tennis player.

Biography
Brabenec, who was born in Czechoslovakia, won the Canadian national indoor singles championships in 1979. 

A left-handed player, he featured primarily in doubles while competing on the Grand Prix circuit in the 1980s. His best performance came at the 1982 Canadian Open, where he partnered with Ivan Lendl to reach the doubles semi-finals. He made doubles main draw appearances at both the French Open and Wimbledon.

Between 1980 and 1985 he represented the Canada Davis Cup team, which for much of this time was coached by his father, Josef Brabenec Sr. In his debut tie against the Caribbean/West Indies he played and won two singles rubbers, but in his five other appearance was used as a doubles specialist.

See also
List of Canada Davis Cup team representatives

References

External links
 
 
 

1957 births
Living people
Canadian male tennis players
Czechoslovak emigrants to Canada
Tennis players at the 1979 Pan American Games
Pan American Games competitors for Canada
Sportspeople from Ostrava